Pappu Sain (Urdu: پپو سائیں; born 1925/6 – died 7 November 2021) was a sufi dhol player. He performed every Thursday evening at the Tomb of Shah Jamal in Ichhra, Lahore, Pakistan.

His band was known as Qalandar bass. Pappu Sain was accompanied by his son Qalandar Baksh and others.

References

1920s births
2021 deaths
Pakistani drummers
Performers of Sufi music
Dhol players
Musicians from Lahore
Year of birth missing